John  Carruthers Scandrett (22 February 1915 – 29 August 2006) was a New Zealand cricketer. He played four first-class matches for Otago between 1935 and 1944.

See also
 List of Otago representative cricketers

References

External links
 

1915 births
2006 deaths
New Zealand cricketers
Otago cricketers
Cricketers from Invercargill
Burials at Eastern Cemetery, Invercargill